Stefano Battaglia  (born 1965 in Milan) is an Italian classical and jazz pianist.

He performed as a soloist with the European Youth Orchestra in Barcelona (1981). He won the J.S. Bach Festival award in Düsseldorf for best new pianist of the year (1986) and the Brussels National Radio Award as the best young European pianist (1997).

He has taught at the Siena Jazz summer program.
Battaglia is a founder of the jazz group Triplicity and Theatrum as part of the Permanent Workshop for Musical Research in Siena. He also recorded with Michele Rabbia.

Discography

As leader

References

External links
Official site
"Stefano Battaglia", The World, PRI

1965 births
Living people
21st-century pianists
Avant-garde jazz pianists
Free jazz pianists
Italian musicians
Mainstream jazz pianists
Musicians from Milan
Post-bop pianists